Eastaboga is an unincorporated community on the border of Talladega and Calhoun counties in the U.S. state of Alabama. It was previously called McFall, named for a settling family in the 1850s, and incorporated in 1898, only to be disincorporated in 1901. The original community of Eastaboga was to the south and became known as Old Eastaboga after McFall's name was changed to Eastaboga.

Eastaboga (historically Estaboga) means "where the people reside" in Muscogee, a Native American language.

Geography

Eastaboga is located in the northern part of Talladega County on the border with Calhoun County. The largest city of over 20,000 people in the area is Anniston, which is east  via I-20 or US 78.

Demographics

The present unincorporated community of Eastaboga was listed as the incorporated town of McFall on the 1900 census and had 820 residents. Of that, a majority, 482, lived on the Talladega County side, and 338 lived on the Calhoun County side. It was disincorporated after just 3 years in 1901 and the post office closed under that name in 1906. At some point on, it was renamed Eastaboga (while the nearby community to the south of the same name became "Old Eastaboga").

Notable people
Howie Camp, former Major League Baseball outfielder for the New York Yankees
Johnny Ray, NASCAR driver
Kevin Ray, NASCAR driver
Adam Paul Reynolds, Navy Corpsman involved in OIF and OEF conflicts.
William,Bill,Brewer notable local legend. Football player as noted in the Anniston Star and Talladega Daily home newspapers. 
Darrell Ingram notable local legend. Football player noted in Anniston Star newspaper in the 1968-69 also all conference baseball player in Gulf South Conference in 73–75.

See also
Old Eastaboga, Alabama

References

Unincorporated communities in Calhoun County, Alabama
Unincorporated communities in Alabama
Alabama placenames of Native American origin